Seda "Patricia" Aznavour (born Seda Aznavourian; May 21, 1947) is a French singer and artist, the daughter of Charles Aznavour.

She studied at the Armenian Virgins College of Paris, at Jan-Luciere and Matie Alter musical schools.

She started her musical career in the 1960s, as a radio and TV singer, then released "Rien Que Nous" album (with David Alexandre Winter). She recorded the "Safo" (1970) movie songtrack (written by Georges Garvarentz), played in several French films.

In the 1960s she moved to the United States, where in 1980 she gave a concert tour with Lucy Saroyan. In 1988 Seda recorded "Chants traditionnels Armeniens" album where she performs Yes Qo Ghimetn Chim Gidi (Ես քո ղիմեթն չիմ գիտի) song by Sayat-Nova in a duet with Charles Aznavour. In 2010 they recorded a new duet in Armenian.

Selected discography
Suis le soleil, United Artists Records
On ne valse plus à Vienne, FTC / Discodis
Les marins, FTC
Juste un dernier verre, FTC / Sofrason - Saïga
Pour moi toute seule, United Artists Records
Rien que nous, (David Alexandre WINTER et Seda AZNAVOUR), 1971, Barclay
Peut-être…!, 1971, Barclay
Les champignons hallucinogènes, 1972
Chants traditionnels Armeniens, 1988, MusArm

Filmography
La Part des lions (The Lion's Share, 1971)
Paris au mois d'août (Paris in August, 1966)

References

External links
Seda Aznavour: Discography

Memoires of Aida Aznavour (in Russian)

French women singers
1947 births
French people of Armenian descent
Living people
French emigrants to the United States